Teulisna bertha is a moth in the family Erebidae. It was described by Arthur Gardiner Butler in 1877. It is found on Java and Bali.

References

Arctiidae genus list at Butterflies and Moths of the World of the Natural History Museum

Moths described in 1877
bertha